The Finnish Men's Curling Championship is the national championship of men's curling in Finland. It has been held annually since 1983. From 1983 until 1998 it was known as the Finnish Cup. Since 1999 the Finnish championship team has been determined by the winning team of the Finnish Men's Championships league.

List of champions

References

See also
Finnish Women's Curling Championship
Finnish Mixed Curling Championship
Finnish Mixed Doubles Curling Championship
Finnish Wheelchair Curling Championship
Finnish Junior Curling Championships